Niklaus Weckmann (active c. 1481–1526, Ulm) was a German sculptor.

Further reading 
 Hannelore Hägele. "Weckmann, Niklaus." In Grove Art Online. Oxford Art Online, (accessed January 1, 2012; subscription required).
 Erwin Treu (ed.): Ulmer Museum, Katalog I: Bildhauerei und Malerei vom 13. Jahrhundert bis 1600, Ulm 1981
 Meisterwerke massenhaft. Die Bildhauerwerkstatt des Niklaus Weckmann und die Malerei in Ulm um 1500. Württembergischen Landesmuseum Stuttgart, 1993, 
 Barbara Maier-Lörcher, Meisterwerke Ulmer Kunst, Jan Thorbecke Verlag, Ostfildern 2004,

External links 
 

People from Ulm
Year of birth uncertain
1520s deaths
15th-century German sculptors
German male sculptors
16th-century German sculptors